The Kei myotis (Myotis stalkeri) is a species of vesper bat. It is found only in Indonesia.

References

External link

Mouse-eared bats
Taxonomy articles created by Polbot
Taxa named by Oldfield Thomas
Mammals described in 1910
Bats of Indonesia